This page summarises the Australia national soccer team fixtures and results in 2008.

Summary
The main focus for the National Team was to attempt to qualify for their third World Cup. The 2010 campaign was Australia's first as a member of the AFC and they entered the qualification in the Third Round drawn into a group containing Qatar, Iraq and China. Matches took place from February until June and Australia had already succeeded in moving through the next round when they lost to China at home in the final game. Despite this, they still topped the group.

Fourth Round qualifying had Australia in a group with Bahrain, Japan, Qatar and Uzbekistan. By the end of the calendar year, they had played three games for three wins and were sitting top of the group with five games yet to be played.

They also enjoyed a come from behind friendly win away to the Netherlands who were ranked four in the world at the time. Australia finished the year ranked 28 on the FIFA Rankings.

Record

Match results

Friendlies

World Cup qualifiers

Goal scorers

References

2008
2008 in Australian soccer
2008 national football team results